The 2019 Nigerian House of Representatives elections in Bayelsa State was held on February 23, 2019, to elect members of the House of Representatives to represent Bayelsa State, Nigeria.

Overview

Summary

Results

Brass/Nembe 
A total of 13 candidates registered with the Independent National Electoral Commission to contest in the election. APC candidate Israel Sunny Goli won the election, defeating PDP Ebikake Marie Enenimiete and other party candidates.

Ogbia 
A total of 15 candidates registered with the Independent National Electoral Commission to contest in the election. PDP candidate Obua Azibapu Fred  won the election, defeating ADC Rex-ogbuku Jude Amiditor and  other party candidates.

Sagbama/Ekeremor 
A total of 20 candidates registered with the Independent National Electoral Commission to contest in the election. PDP candidate Agbedi Yeitiemone Frederick  won the election, defeating APC Daunemigha Famous Oroupafebo and  other party candidates.

Southern Ijaw 
A total of 17 candidates registered with the Independent National Electoral Commission to contest in the election. APC candidate Preye Influence Goodluck Oseke  won the election, defeating Benson Friday Konbowei of PDP and  other party candidates.

Yenagoa/Kolokuna/Opokuma 
A total of 20 candidates registered with the Independent National Electoral Commission to contest in the election. PDP candidate Stephen Sinikiem Azaiki won the election, defeating APC Blankson Edwin Osomkime and  other party candidates.

References 

Bayelsa State House of Representatives elections
House of Representatives
Bayelsa